Adscita is a genus of moths of the family Zygaenidae.

Selected species

 Subgenus Adscita Retzius, 1783
 Adscita albanica (Naufock, 1926)
 Adscita alpina (Alberti, 1937)
 Adscita bolivari (Agenjo, 1937)
 Adscita capitalis (Staudinger, 1879)
 Adscita geryon (Hübner, 1813)
 Adscita jordani (Naufock, 1921)
 Adscita krymensis Efetov, 1994
 Adscita mannii (Lederer, 1853)
 Adscita mauretanica (Naufock, 1932)
 Adscita obscura (Zeller, 1847)
 Adscita schmidti (Naufock, 1933)
 Adscita statices – green forester (Linnaeus, 1758)
 Adscita storaiae (Tarmann, 1977)
 Adscita turcosa Retzius, 1783
 Subgenus Zygaenoprocris Hampson
 Adscita taftana (Alberti, 1939)

References
 Adscita at Markku Savela's Lepidoptera and some other life forms

Procridinae
Zygaenidae genera